Iron Man is a Canadian fictional character, created by cartoonist Vernon Miller for Maple Leaf Publishing. A superhero, the character's debut was in the first issue of Better Comics in March 1941, a colour title, unlike most of the other Canadian comic books at the time which were printed in black-and-white and known as "Canadian Whites".

Although he lacked a distinct Canadian identity, Iron Man was the first Canadian superhero and, like many comic book heroes of the time, he fought against the Nazis. He predates the better-known Marvel Comics character by 22 years and bears no likeness to that Iron Man. Superficially, he better resembles the amphibious Namor, the Sub-Mariner, who debuted two years earlier.

Fictional history
Iron Man was the last member of a mutated human subspecies that lived in the South Seas, having survived a devastating earthquake which eradicated his people. He lived alone in a sunken palace until roused from his mourning by World War II. After being summoned by two children and an adult named the Major, he threw in his lot with the Allies, viewing the Nazis as no better than pirates, whom he also hated.

Special powers
Iron Man was amphibious, indestructable, and had superhuman strength with which he could make great leaps and punch through steel.

See also

Canadian comics
Canadian Whites
Nelvana of the Northern Lights

References

Canadian comics
1941 comics debuts
Superhero comics
Comics characters introduced in 1941
Canadian comics characters
Canadian superheroes
Comics characters with superhuman strength
Male characters in comics